Samuel Carter (December 8, 1859 – June 16, 1944) was an Ontario manufacturer and political figure. He represented Wellington South in the Legislative Assembly of Ontario from 1914 to 1919 as a Liberal-Prohibitionist member when he ran as an independent Liberal and was defeated by Caleb Buckland.

He was born in Ruddington, Nottinghamshire, England, the son of Samuel Carter and came to Canada West in 1882. He owned a knitting mill. Carter served as mayor of Guelph from 1913 to 1914. He was vice-president of the Hydro-Electric Union and chairman of the Heat and Light Commission for the city. He was also president of the Workingman's Co-operative Association of Guelph. In 1909, he became the first president of the Co-operative Union of Canada (later part of the Canadian Co-operative Association), serving until 1921. Carter was an unsuccessful candidate for a seat in the federal parliament in 1921. He died at his home in Guelph in 1944.

Carter donated the Elms Park playing field to the village of Ruddington in 1931.

Notes

References 
 Canadian Parliamentary Guide, 1915, EJ Chambers

External links 

International Co-operative Information Centre
History of Guelph, 1827-1927, LA Johnson (1977)

1859 births
1944 deaths
Canadian cooperative organizers
Ontario Liberal Party MPPs
Mayors of Guelph
People from Ruddington